The 1997 IIHF Women's World Championships was held March 31 – April 6, 1997, in seven Canadian cities all in the Province of Ontario. Team Canada won their fourth consecutive gold medal at the World Championships defeating the United States, however this time the United States took Canada in the closest final so far, losing in overtime. Finland picked up their fourth consecutive bronze medal, with a win over China who made the Semi-Final for the second consecutive year.

This tournament also served as the qualifier for the Nagano Olympics, with the top five finishers joining host Japan.  Sweden defeated first Switzerland, then Russia, in the consolation round to join the four semi-finalists in the Olympics.

Qualification

The following teams participated in the championship. Qualification was the top three from the 1996 Pacific Rim Championship, and the top five from the 1996 European Championship.

Pacific Rim Championship:

European Championship:

Final tournament

The eight participating teams were divided up into two seeded groups as below. The teams played each other once in a single round robin format. The top two teams from the group proceeded to the Final Round, while the remaining teams played in the consolation round.

First round

Group A

Standings

Results
All times local

Group B

Standings

Results
All times local

Playoff round

Consolation round 5–8 place

Consolation round 7–8 place

Consolation round 5–6 place

Final round

Semifinals

Match for third place

Final

Champions

Tournament Awards

The following was selected as the All-Star team of the tournament:

 Goaltender - Patricia Sautter 
 Defence - Cassie Campbell 
 Defence - Kelly O'Leary 
 Forward - Hayley Wickenheiser 
 Forward - Cammi Granato 
 Forward - Riikka Nieminen

Final standings

Scoring leaders

References

External links
 Summary from the Women's Hockey Net
 Detailed summary from passionhockey.com

World
International ice hockey competitions hosted by Canada
World
IIHF Women's World Ice Hockey Championships
March 1997 sports events in Canada
April 1997 sports events in Canada
Women's ice hockey competitions in Canada
1997 in Ontario
Sport in Brantford
Sport in Brampton
Ice hockey competitions in Hamilton, Ontario
20th century in Hamilton, Ontario
Sport in Kitchener, Ontario
Sports competitions in London, Ontario
Sport in Mississauga